William Henry Crossland (Yorkshire, 1835 – London, 14 November 1908), known professionally as W.H. Crossland, was a 19th-century English architect and a pupil of George Gilbert Scott. His architectural works included the design of three buildings that are now Grade I listed – Rochdale Town Hall, Holloway Sanatorium and Royal Holloway College.

Early life and education
Crossland was born in 1835 to a family living in Huddersfield. He was the younger son of Henry Crossland, who is recorded in the 1851 census as being a farmer and quarry owner, and his wife, Ellen (née Wilkinson). He had an elder brother, James, born in 1833. 

Crossland enrolled at Huddersfield College, where he excelled in writing and drawing. In the early 1850s Crossland became a pupil of George Gilbert Scott at his architectural practice in London. He worked with Scott on the design of the model village Akroydon, near Halifax, West Yorkshire, commissioned by the worsted manufacturer, Edward Akroyd.

Principal works
Crossland, who was elected  a Fellow of the Royal Institute of British Architects in 1867, developed his own architectural practice, with offices in Halifax and Leeds, before moving to London and then, in 1879, opening an office in Egham, Surrey. More than 25 of the buildings he designed are listed by Historic England. 

Crossland's three most important commissions, all now Grade I listed, were:
 Rochdale Town Hall, which was built 1866–71 and is still in use as a municipal building in Rochdale, now in Greater Manchester, where it functions as the ceremonial headquarters of Rochdale Metropolitan Borough Council. Architectural historian Nikolaus Pevsner described the building as possessing a "rare picturesque beauty". Its stained glass windows are credited as "the finest modern examples of their kind". Historic England describe it as "an important early departure from High Victorian heaviness" and say it is "widely recognised as being one of the finest municipal buildings in the country". Following a fire, Crossland's original clock tower was replaced in 1887 by a stone clock tower and spire designed by Alfred Waterhouse in the style of Manchester Town Hall. 

 Holloway Sanatorium at Virginia Water, Surrey, which was built 1873–85. This was a project commissioned by the entrepreneur and philanthropist Thomas Holloway. Historic England describe it as "the most elaborate and impressive Victorian lunatic asylum in England, because it was the most lavish to be built for private patients... The quality of the external design and the decoration of the principal spaces is exceptional". It is the only example of a Sanatorium to be listed at Grade I. It was restored in 1997–98 and converted to luxury homes as part of a gated residential estate known as Virginia Park.

 Royal Holloway College, Egham, Surrey, which was built 1879–87. A short distance away from the Sanatorium, it was also commissioned by Thomas Holloway. Now known as Founder's Building, it is the main building of a major college of the University of London; its cafe/bar is named "Crosslands". Crossland's main floor plan for the college is on display in the Royal Holloway College Picture Gallery.

The Holloway Sanatorium and Royal Holloway College were inspired by the Cloth Hall of Ypres in Belgium and the Château de Chambord in the Loire Valley, France, respectively and are considered by some to be among the most remarkable buildings in the south of England.

Other significant works

In her biography of Crossland, published in 2020, Sheila Binns provides the most complete list yet of his architectural commissions, drawing on and supplementing earlier work by John Elliott, itself based on a compilation by Edward Law.  Those that are listed by Historic England, many of them in Yorkshire, are included here.

Berkshire

Greater Manchester

North Yorkshire

South Yorkshire

West Yorkshire

Later life
Crossland's last entry in the RIBA's records was in 1894–95. There is no record of him undertaking any work after 1900, when he ceased to be architectural adviser to Royal Holloway.

Personal and family life

On 1 October 1859, Crossland married Lavinia Cardwell Pigot (who died in Boulogne, France on 17 January 1876). They had one child – a daughter, Maud, who was born on 10 July 1860 and died on 8 March 1900.  Crossland also had an illegitimate son, Cecil Henry Crossland Hatt (born 1877), with his second (common-law) wife, (Eliza) Ruth Hatt (née Tilley; 1853–1892). She became a well-known actress, using the stage name Ruth Rutland, and they lived together in a bungalow on the Royal Holloway site, designed by Crossland and built in 1878 as a home for himself and his family while he oversaw  Holloway College's construction.

Crossland died at 57 Albert Street, Camden, London on 14 November 1908 following a stroke.  His wife Lavinia, his brother James Crossland, his common-law wife Eliza Ruth Hatt, his daughter Maud Lart, his parents-in-law and his stepson Benjamin Tilley Hatt are buried in a family vault at Highgate Cemetery. Although Crossland's will specifically stated that he and his son should be interred there, neither of them is in the family vault. Crossland's place of burial is unknown.

Crossland was survived by his son Cecil (by then known as Cecil Hatt Crossland) and two grand-daughters –  Maud and her husband William Lart's  daughter Dorothea Maud (born 1881), and Cecil and his wife Lucy's daughter Beryl Joan (born 1905).

Notes

References

Sources
 Binns, Sheila (2020). W.H. Crossland: An Architectural Biography. The Lutterworth Press. 258pp. .

External links
 Crossland's biographer, Sheila Binns, talking about Crossland while giving a tour of what is now the Founder's Building at Royal Holloway, YouTube, 11 September 2020. Retrieved 19 June 2022.

1835 births
1908 deaths
19th-century English architects
Architects from Huddersfield
Architects from Yorkshire
Architects of Anglican churches
Architecture firms based in Halifax, Yorkshire
Architecture firms based in Leeds
Architecture firms based in London
Architecture firms based in Surrey
Architecture firms of England
Buildings and structures in Greater Manchester
Buildings and structures in Huddersfield
Buildings and structures in South Yorkshire
Buildings and structures in Surrey
Buildings and structures in West Yorkshire
Burials at Highgate Cemetery
English ecclesiastical architects
Fellows of the Royal Institute of British Architects
Gothic Revival architects
Gothic Revival architecture in Greater Manchester
Gothic Revival architecture in Surrey
Gothic Revival architecture in West Yorkshire
People associated with Royal Holloway, University of London
William Henry Crossland buildings